Silhak was a Korean Confucian social reform movement in late Joseon Dynasty. Sil means "actual" or "practical", and hak means "studies" or "learning". It developed in response to the increasingly metaphysical nature of Neo-Confucianism (성리학) that seemed disconnected from the rapid agricultural, industrial, and political changes occurring in Korea between the late 17th and early 19th centuries. Silhak was designed to counter the "uncritical" following of Confucian teachings and the strict adherence to "formalism" and "ritual" by neo-Confucians. Most of the Silhak scholars were from factions excluded from power and other disaffected scholars calling for reform. They advocated an empirical Confucianism deeply concerned with human society at the practical level.

Its proponents generally argued for reforming the rigid Confucian social structure, land reforms to relieve the plight of peasant farmers, promoting Korea's own national identity and culture, encouraging the study of science, and advocating technology exchange with foreign countries. Silhak scholars wanted to use realistic and experimental approaches to social problems with the consideration of the welfare of the people. Silhak scholars encouraged human equality and moved toward a more Korean-centric view of Korean history. The Silhak school is credited with helping to create a modern Korea.

Prominent scholars
 Yi Ji-ham, 1517–1578, a scholar, seer, and public official who believed in the importance of skill-building, markets, and trade, and implemented related programs while serving as magistrate of Pocheon and Asan. While he predates Silhak as an explicit approach, his legend has been connected to the Silhak movement.
 Kim Yuk, 1580–1658, postwar reformer who vigorously advocated Daedongbeop (Uniform Land Tax Law), introduced into Korea a reformed calendar, and supported technological improvements
 Yi Su-gwang, 1563–1627, scholar-official who introduced Western science, religion, and social studies to Korea.
 Yu Hyeong-won, 1622–1673, representing what is sometimes considered the first generation of Silhak scholars, he advocated a "public land system" where the state would hold title and allocate the land for the farmer to use.
 Yi Ik, 1681–1764, of the second generation of Silhak scholars, founder of the Gyeongsechiyongpa (경세치용파 經世致用派 School of Administration and Practical Usage), advocating reforms of land ownership, economic infrastructure, and government administration. This is known as the "equal field system" and was supposed to guarantee enough land for each farmer to provide for his livelihood. Yi Ik, contrary to the neo-Confucians, believed that subjects such as geography and mathematics could be approached as real academic disciplines.
 Ahn Jeong-bok, 1712–1791, student of Yi Ik.
 Yun Hyu, 1617–1680
 Park Se-dang, 1629–1703, scholar of poetry, literature, calligraphy and painting.
 Yu Su-won, 1694–1755, representing what is sometimes considered the founder of the Iyonghusaengpa (이용후생파 利用厚生派 School of Profitable Usage and Benefiting the People).
 Park Ji-won, 1737–1805, the center of the Iyonghusaengpa (이용후생파 利用厚生派 School of Profitable Usage and Benefiting the People), promoting industrialization, commerce, and the introduction of foreign technology.
 Sin Gyeong-jun, 1712–1781
 Wi Baek-gyu, 1727–1798
 Hong Dae-yong, 1731–1783, was an astronomer who asserted the Copernican theory.
 Yi Deok-mu, 1741–1793
 Pak Je-ga, 1750–1815, was a part of the Northern School of Silhak and was particularly critical of the civil service examinations (kwago), which was designed to select the most intelligent men for high governmental service but had become corrupt and allowed incompetent men into government.
 Kim Jeonghui, 1786–1856, representing the Silsagusipa (실사구시파 實事求是派 School of Seeking Evidence)
 Jeong Yak-yong, 1762–1836 (informally known as "Dasan"), led the third wave of Silhak. Like a number of other Silhak scholars, he was interested in some Christian ideas. However, he renounced these deviations from Confucianism and thus (unlike his older brother) escaped the headsman's axe in the anti-Catholic persecution of 1801. He was an advocate for the right of the people (min kwon). He advocated a strengthening of rigid class boundaries which had largely collapsed by the 18th century. Specifically, he suggested a "village land system," in which the village would hold its land in common and farm the land as a whole, while the products of the land would be divided based on the amount of labor contributed. He seems to have stopped expressing these radical notions at some point, but continued to believe that the common people should be able to participate in the government, to criticize the government, and have a voice in selecting their leaders. He wrote The Mind Governing the People (목민심서) and argued that a rigid social class order with the king at the top was necessary for the government to maintain order but also favored experimentation for the social good.
 Seo Yu-gu 1764-1845
 Choi han-ki 1803-1877

See also
 Korean Confucianism
 Seohak

References

External links 
 Baker D (1999), A different thread: Orthodoxy, heterodoxy and Catholicism in a Confucian world, in JHK Haboush & M Deuchler (eds.), Culture and State in Late Chosŏn Korea. Harv. Univ. Press, pp. 199–230.
 
 

History of Korea
Korean Confucianism
17th-century establishments in Korea